The 2020 season was the Minnesota Vikings' 60th in the National Football League (NFL), their fifth playing home games at U.S. Bank Stadium and their seventh under head coach Mike Zimmer. This was the Vikings' first time since 2005 that long-time assistant Kevin Stefanski was not part of the Vikings coaching staff, as he left to become the new head coach of the Cleveland Browns on January 12, 2020. After going 1–5 in their first six games for the first time since 2013, the team failed to improve upon their 10–6 record from 2019 after a Week 11 loss to the Dallas Cowboys and failed to match their 10–6 record after a Week 14 loss to the Tampa Bay Buccaneers. The Vikings were eliminated from playoff contention following a week 16 loss to the New Orleans Saints, and ultimately finished 7–9, their first losing season since 2014. The Vikings conceded 475 points during the season, the third-highest total in franchise history, although they also managed to score 430 points, also the third-most in team history.

Offseason

Transactions

Draft
The Vikings had a total of 15 selections in the 2020 NFL Draft, a record number since the draft moved to a seven-round format in 1994. Although they had lost their original fifth-round pick to the Baltimore Ravens in the trade for kicker/punter Kaare Vedvik prior to the 2019 season and their seventh-round pick in the trade that sent wide receiver Stefon Diggs to the Buffalo Bills earlier in the 2020 offseason, the Diggs trade gave the Vikings extra picks in the first, fifth and sixth rounds. They also had an extra pick in the seventh round after trading guard Danny Isidora to the Miami Dolphins at the start of the 2019 season, as well as one compensatory pick in the third round and two in the seventh as a result of free agency losses in 2019.

After taking Louisiana State wide receiver Justin Jefferson 22nd overall with the first-round pick they acquired from the Bills, the Vikings traded their original first-round pick (25th overall) to the San Francisco 49ers in exchange for the 31st overall pick, as well as selections in the fourth and fifth rounds; with the 31st overall pick, the Vikings took Texas Christian cornerback Jeff Gladney. The Vikings used their second-round pick on Boise State offensive tackle Ezra Cleveland, then took Mississippi State cornerback Cameron Dantzler in the third round, before trading their third-round compensatory pick to the New Orleans Saints for the Saints' remaining picks in the fourth, fifth, sixth and seventh rounds.

In the fourth round, the Vikings used the picks they acquired from the 49ers and Saints to select South Carolina defensive end D. J. Wonnum and Baylor defensive tackle James Lynch, before taking Oregon linebacker Troy Dye with their original fourth-round pick. The Vikings traded the fifth-round pick they acquired from the Bills to the Chicago Bears for a fourth-round pick in the 2021 draft, before using their remaining fifth-round selections on Temple Owls cornerback Harrison Hand and Miami wide receiver K. J. Osborn. In the sixth round, the Vikings traded the other pick they acquired from the Bills – along with the seventh-round selection they got from the Dolphins – to the Ravens for another seventh-round pick and a fifth-round pick in 2021 before taking Oregon State offensive tackle Blake Brandel and Michigan safety Josh Metellus. The Vikings then had four remaining picks in the seventh round, which they used on Michigan State Spartans defensive end Kenny Willekes, Iowa quarterback Nate Stanley, Mississippi State safety Brian Cole II and Washburn guard Kyle Hinton.

Notes
The Vikings were awarded three compensatory selections at the NFL's annual spring owners' meetings. They received one additional pick in the third round and two in the seventh round, compensating for the losses of Sheldon Richardson, Trevor Siemian and Tom Compton.

Draft trades

Staff

Final roster

Preseason
The Vikings' preseason schedule was announced on May 7, but was canceled in late July due to the COVID-19 pandemic.

Regular season

Schedule
The Vikings' 2020 schedule was announced on May 7.

Note: Intra-division opponents are in bold text.

Game summaries

Week 1: vs. Green Bay Packers

This was the Vikings' first loss in their season opener since 2015. The 43 points scored by the Packers was the most the Vikings had conceded in a season opener in franchise history. Wide receiver Adam Thielen scored two touchdowns for the first time since Week 5 of the 2019 season against the New York Giants.

Week 2: at Indianapolis Colts

This loss dropped the Vikings to 0–2 for the first time since 2013. Quarterback Kirk Cousins was intercepted three times on 26 pass attempts that included just 11 completions for 113 yards; he ended up with a passer rating of 15.9.

Week 3: vs. Tennessee Titans

Week 4: at Houston Texans

Week 5: at Seattle Seahawks

Week 6: vs. Atlanta Falcons

Week 8: at Green Bay Packers

Week 9: vs. Detroit Lions

Week 10: at Chicago Bears

Week 11: vs. Dallas Cowboys

Week 12: vs. Carolina Panthers

Week 13: vs. Jacksonville Jaguars

Week 14: at Tampa Bay Buccaneers

Week 15: vs. Chicago Bears

Week 16: at New Orleans Saints

With the loss, Minnesota was eliminated from the playoffs, clinching their first losing season since 2014 and only the second under head coach Mike Zimmer.

Week 17: at Detroit Lions

Standings

Division

Conference

Statistics

Team leaders

Source: Minnesota Vikings' official website

League rankings

Source: NFL.com

Pro Bowl
Two Vikings players—running back Dalvin Cook and rookie wide receiver Justin Jefferson—were selected for the 2021 Pro Bowl, the team's lowest contribution to the event since 2014, when they had no Pro Bowlers. Cook received the most votes among NFC running backs to go to his second Pro Bowl (after his rookie season in 2017), and only Russell Wilson received more votes out of any position in the NFC team, while Jefferson was the Vikings' first rookie wide receiver to be selected since Percy Harvin in 2009.

References

External links
 

Minnesota
Minnesota Vikings seasons
Minnesota Vikings